Simeon Datumanong (June 17, 1935 – February 28, 2017) was a Filipino Muslim politician who held different government positions including being a representative of the lone district of Maguindanao in the House of Representatives of the Philippines. He was married to Hadja Sittie Mariam Sigrid de Guzman Datumanong and had four children.

Education

He finished elementary school as the class valedictorian at Cotabato Central School in Cotabato City on 1949. He was the first honorable mention when he finished his high school studies at Cotabato High School. Right after finishing high school, he took up Bachelor of Laws at the University of the Philippines. He was admitted to the Bar in 1959.

Political career

Datumanong entered politics when he was elected as Vice-Governor (1963–1967) then as Governor (1967–1971) of Cotabato. When the province of Cotabato was split to the provinces of Maguindanao, Sultan Kudarat, and North Cotabato, he was elected as the first governor of Maguindanao in 1973 and served until 1975. He was then elected to the Regular Batasang Pambansa from Maguindanao in 1984.
In 1992, Datumanong was elected to the Philippine House of Representatives to represent Maguindanao's Second District. He served until 2001 when he was appointed by President Gloria Macapagal Arroyo as Secretary of Public Works and Highways. In 2003, he was Secretary of Justice and served until his resignation in the same year. He was reelected to the Philippine House of Representatives in 2007.

References

 Datumanong resume
 Datumanong Personal Information

|-

|-

|-

|-

1935 births
2017 deaths
Secretaries of Justice of the Philippines
Secretaries of Public Works and Highways of the Philippines
Members of the House of Representatives of the Philippines from Maguindanao
Governors of Cotabato
Governors of Maguindanao
Governors of former provinces of the Philippines
Lakas–CMD politicians
University of the Philippines alumni
Filipino former Christians
Filipino Muslims
Arroyo administration cabinet members
Deputy Speakers of the House of Representatives of the Philippines
Members of the Batasang Pambansa